Mouhammed-Ali Najib Dhaini (born 1 March 1994) is a footballer who plays as a defensive midfielder for Superettan club Trelleborgs FF and the Lebanon national team.

Having begun his senior career in Sweden at Division 3 side BK Olympic in 2013, Dhaini joined Torns IF in the Division 2 in 2017, helping them gain promotion to the Division 1 in his first season. In 2020, he joined Superettan club Trelleborgs FF.

Born in Sweden, Dhaini is of Lebanese descent; he made his senior debut for Lebanon in 2020.

Club career

Torns IF 
Dhaini joined Swedish Division 2 side Torns IF on 2 January 2017. He played 27 games, 25 in the league and two in the Svenska Cupen, helping his side gain promotion to the Division 1. Dhaini was nominated 2017 Torns FF Player of the Year for his performances.

In the Division 1, Dhaini played a total of 59 games (29 in 2018 and 30 in 2019), scoring once in 2018 against Utsiktens BK. Dhaini played 90 games in total for Torns IF.

Trelleborgs FF 
Following a trial in December 2019, Dhaini moved to Superettan side Trelleborgs FF on a one-year contract on 17 February 2020. Following a knee operation, Dhaini made his debut on 13 July against GAIS. He played 21 league games, making three assists, and helped his side remain in the Superettan after beating IF Brommapojkarna on penalty shoot-outs in the relegation playoffs.

Trelleborg extended Dhaini's contract for two years on 14 January 2021. Dhaini scored his first goal for Trelleborg on 10 May, helping his team draw 1–1 in the 2021 Superettan against Akropolis. On 26 October, Dhaini scored a brace in a 4–0 league win against AFC Eskilstuna. During the 2022 season, he helped Trelleborg come back from 2–0 down to win 4–2 against Dalkurd on 21 August, scoring the temporary 1–2 goal.

International career 

Dhaini made his debut for the Lebanon national team in a friendly against Bahrain on 12 November 2020.

Style of play 
A defensive midfielder, Dhaini has been noted for his passing and ball retention. Salif Camara Jönsson, team manager at Trelleborgs FF, described Dhaini's dual game and fighting spirit as his main strengths.

Personal life 
Dhaini has a younger brother, an older sister and a younger sister. While playing for BK Olympic, Dhaini worked at a bakery.

Career statistics

Club

International

Honours 
Individual
 : 2017
 Torns IF Player of the Year: 2017

See also 
 List of Lebanon international footballers born outside Lebanon

References

External links

 
 Mouhammed Ali-Dhaini at Lagstatistik

1994 births
Living people
People from Strömstad Municipality
Sportspeople from Västra Götaland County
Swedish people of Lebanese descent
Sportspeople of Lebanese descent
Lebanese footballers
Swedish footballers
Association football midfielders
BK Olympic players
Torns IF players
Trelleborgs FF players
Division 3 (Swedish football) players
Division 2 (Swedish football) players
Ettan Fotboll players
Superettan players
Lebanon international footballers